Dominico "Nico" Gibson (born 9 June 1992) is a Scottish professional footballer who plays as a defender or midfielder for Civil Service Strollers.

He has previously played for Aberdeen, East Stirlingshire, Edinburgh City, Kelty Hearts and Broxburn Athletic.

Career
Gibson signed for Aberdeen in June 2009 playing for the under 19's. He made his one and only appearance for the Aberdeen first team on the final day of the season against St Mirren on 8 May 2010.

On 12 August 2011, Gibson signed for East Stirlingshire having been released by Aberdeen in the summer.

Gibson left East Stirlingshire in 2012 after scoring two goals in 11 games with the club. Gibson subsequently signed for Edinburgh City in 2014, where he spent three seasons before being released in 2017.

Gibson has a short spell at Kelty Hearts before signing for Broxburn Athletic.

Civil Service Strollers announced they had signed Gibson on 10 October 2020.

Career statistics

References

External links

1992 births
Aberdeen F.C. players
East Stirlingshire F.C. players
Living people
Footballers from Edinburgh
Scottish Premier League players
Scottish Football League players
Scottish footballers
Association football midfielders
Civil Service Strollers F.C players
Kelty Hearts F.C. players
F.C. Edinburgh players
Broxburn Athletic F.C. players